Phil Henry may refer to:

 Philip Henry (1631–1696), English Nonconformist clergyman and diarist
 Phil Henry (rower) (born 1971), American rower
 Phillip Henry of Edgelarks, an English folk music duo